MV Ondina was an oil tanker built in 1939 and owned by Royal Dutch Shell; initially operated by the La Corona shipping company. In November 1942, during the Second World War, it was attacked in the Indian Ocean by two Japanese commerce raiders, one of which (the ) was sunk possibly by a shell fired by the Ondina. After the war it continued operating until decommissioned and broken up in 1959.

Description 
Its armament consisted of a single  quick-firing gun and several machine guns.

Career 

Launched in April 1939, Ondina was built at the NDSM shipyard in Amsterdam, in the Netherlands. Completed in August 1939, prior to the Second World War the vessel sailed for La Corona, a subsidiary of the Royal Dutch Shell company.

Second World War 
In November 1942, Ondina took part in the battle against the Japanese auxiliary cruisers and raiders Aikoku Maru and Hōkoku Maru where it was damaged; after which it was temporarily repaired and then sent to Exmouth Gulf in Western Australia where she was stationed from 22 June 1943 supplying fuel to US submarines. On 1 September 1943 the Ondina also supplied fuel to the ship  then taking part in Operation Jaywick, the raid on Singapore. At the end of 1943 the ship was sent to the US for repairs at Tampa, sailing via Melbourne, Balboa, Panama Canal and Galveston.

Action against Japanese raiders 
The Japanese ships were each armed with eight  guns, while Ondina had only a 102 mm gun and Bengal a single 4-inch weapon. Both Allied ships scored hits on the Hōkoku Maru which blew up and sank. Ondina was so damaged in the action that the captain ordered "abandon ship", after which he died. With the tanker's crew in lifeboats, Aikoku Maru killed some with machine-gun fire, rescued the majority of the crew of the sunken Hōkoku Maru, and retired. Ondina did not sink, so its crew reboarded, repaired some of the damage, and reached port safely.

Postwar 
Ondina was decommissioned and scrapped in 1959, at Hong Kong.

See also 
 Japanese raiders in the Indian Ocean

Notes

References

External links 
 

1939 ships
Oil tankers
Tankers of the Netherlands
World War II tankers
World War II merchant ships of the Netherlands
South-East Asian theatre of World War II
Battles of World War II involving Japan